Syed Abrar Hussain (سید ابرار حسین)  is a retired Pakistani career diplomat best known for his service as Pakistan's Ambassador to Afghanistan, Kuwait and Nepal.

Career 
Abrar Hussain joined the Civil services in 1983 as part of the 10th CTP and served for thirty five years. As a Foreign Service Officer, he served in Kuwait (1987-1989), Jeddah (1993-1995), Prague (1995-1997), Kandahar (1999-2001), Beirut (2001-2002) and Brunei (2005-2006) in various capacities.

He was Pakistan’s Ambassador to Nepal from 2008 to 2011. He organized the first 'Made in Pakistan Products Exhibition' held at United World Trade Center, Kathmandu from 19 to 23 May 2010, in collaboration with Pak World Trade & Expo Center Islamabad. which has since become an annual event in Kathmandu. His time there also saw Pakistani Prime Minister Yusuf Raza Gillani's bilateral visit to Nepal on 26 April 2010. Hussain also continued Pakistan Embassy's traditions of giving scholarships to Nepalese students, donations, ambulances for Nepalese hospitals and annually inviting Pakistani singers such as Shafqat Amanat Ali in April 2009.

Hussain became Ambassador to Kuwait in April 2013. During his tenure Sheikh Jaber Al-Mubarak Al-Hamad Al-Sabah Prime Minister of Kuwait visited Pakistan, the first VVIP visit from Kuwait after seven years, which strengthened bilateral relations.

Hussain's stay was cut short in January 2014 as he was needed in Afghanistan.

Syed Abrar Hussain presented credentials as Ambassador of Pakistan to Afghanistan on 25 March 2014. He stayed in Kabul for more than three years. His tenure in Kabul included President Ghani's two visits to Islamabad, Prime Minister Nawaz Sharif and President Mamnoon Hussain's visits to Kabul, Peace Talks (Murree Talks, QCG, etc), Afghan Army Chief's visit to PMA, Pakistan's economic assistance in the field of health, education and infrastructure, revival of work on Torkham-Jalalabad Road and efforts to improve bilateral relations. He organized the 138th and 139th Birth Anniversary Celebrations of Allama Mohammad Iqbal, inviting Afghan scholars who have written about Iqbal and honoring Professor Abdullah Bakhtanay Khidmatgar, who was the first Afghan to write a book on Iqbal in 1956. The papers presented in the seminars were subsequently compiled and published by Pakistan Embassy Kabul l

Ambassador Hussain retired as Special Secretary from the Pakistani Ministry of Foreign Affairs in late 2017

Personal 
Syed Abrar Hussain graduated with a master's degree in English literature from Peshawar University (1979).

He is married with two children.

References 

Pakistani diplomats
Year of birth missing (living people)
Living people